is a Japanese composer of contemporary classical music. He studied in Germany but returned to Japan, finding a personal style inspired by classical Japanese music and culture. He has composed operas, the oratorio Voiceless Voice in Hiroshima, and instrumental music.

He was the cofounder and artistic director of a Japanese festival for contemporary music and has been a composer in residence at international festivals such as the Venice Biennale, Lucerne Festival, Warsaw Autumn and Rheingau Musik Festival. His operas premiered at the Munich Biennale and La Monnaie, among others.

Career 
Hosokawa was born in Hiroshima. He first studied piano and composition in Tokyo, then from 1976 with Yun Isang at the Berlin University of the Arts. From 1983 to 1986, he studied with Klaus Huber and Brian Ferneyhough at the Hochschule für Musik Freiburg. In 1980, he first took part in the Darmstädter Ferienkurse, including the performance of his compositions. He lectured there regularly beginning in 1990. In the following years, he became known internationally and received several commissions.

On a recommendation from Huber, he returned to Japan, where he found his personal style influenced by traditional Japanese music. In 1989, he cofounded the annual Akiyoshidai International Contemporary Music Seminar and Festival in Yamaguchi and was its artistic director until 1998. From 1998 to 2007 he served as Composer-in-Residence at the Tokyo Symphony Orchestra. He was also the artistic director of the Japanese Takefu International Music Festival in Fukui starting in 2001. In 2004, Hosokawa was appointed a guest professor at the Tokyo College of Music. He was a member of the Academy of Arts, Berlin from 2001. He was influenced by Japanese aesthetic and spiritual elements, such as calligraphy, court music and Noh theatre, giving "musical expression to the notion of a beauty that has grown from transience". He said: "We hear the individual notes and appreciate at the same time the process of how the notes are born and die: a sound landscape of continual 'becoming' that is animated in itself."

Hosokawa's first opera, the Shakespeare adaptation Vision of Lear, premiered at the Munich Biennale in 1998. It includes elements from the traditional Japanese Noh theatre. His second opera was Hanjo, which premiered at the Aix-en-Provence Festival in 2004, staged by the choreographer Anne Teresa De Keersmaeker. Co-commissioned with La Monnaie in Brussels, it was also performed in Bielefeld, Hamburg, Lisbon, Lyon, Milan and Tokyo. Hosokawa won the fifth Roche Commission with Woven Dreams for orchestra, which was first played by the Cleveland Orchestra conducted by Franz Welser-Möst at the Lucerne Festival in 2010. His third opera was Matsukaze, again inspired by Noh theatre, which was staged by Sasha Waltz at La Monnaie in Brussels in 2011, with additional performances at the Berlin State Opera and in Luxembourg and Warsaw. His works were premiered by conductors such as Kazushi Ono, Kent Nagano, Simon Rattle, Alexander Liebreich and Robin Ticciati. Several of them became part of contemporary repertoire.

Hosokawa did research in 2006/07 and 2008/09 at the Institute for Advanced Study (Wissenschaftskolleg) in Berlin. He was invited to be composer in residence at festivals such as the Venice Biennale, in both 1995 and 2001; the Lucerne Festival in 2000; musica viva in Munich in 2001; Musica nova in Helsinki in 2003; and the Warsaw Autumn in 2005 and 2007. He served as director of the Suntory Hall International Program for Music Composition from 2012 to 2015.

Invited by Walter Fink, he was the 18th composer featured in the annual Komponistenporträt of the Rheingau Musik Festival in 2008. In a concert of chamber music played by the Arditti Quartet and Mayumi Miyata (Shō), works such as "Silent Flowers" and "Blossoming" were presented, in which the composer tried to give nature a voice (der Natur ... eine Stimme zu geben). and his oratorio Voiceless Voice in Hiroshima was performed at Eberbach Abbey by the WDR Symphony Orchestra Cologne and the WDR Rundfunkchor Köln, conducted by Rupert Huber, with soloist Gerhild Romberger. The oratorio was conceived in 1989 as a requiem for the victims of the nuclear bomb of 6 August 1945, but was expanded to a suite in five movements in 2001 in response to ecological problems due to economic growth. Among the texts is a poem "Heimkehr" (Returning home) by Paul Celan, and a haiku by Matsuo Bashō. The music uses wind sounds, tone clusters, and percussion close to natural sounds, while the choral writing seems to align with European models. In 2010, he composed a chamber music work for his friend Walter Fink, Für Walter (For Walter), for soprano saxophone and piano, with percussion ad libitum, and attended its premiere in a concert on Fink's 80th birthday.

Awards 
Hosokawa has received several awards and honors, including:
 1982: First prize in the composition competition which marked the 100th anniversary of the Berliner Philharmoniker
 1982:  for young composers
 1984: Arion-Musikpreis
 1985: Composition prize of the young generation in Europe
 1988: Kyoto Prize
 1998: Rheingau Musikpreis
 1998: Duisburger Musikpreis
 2001: musica viva-Preis of ARD and BMW
 2007: Suntory Music Award
 2008: Fifth Roche commission

Compositions
IRCAM has a detailed list of Hosokawa's works, several are held by the German National Library:

Opera

Oratorio
 Voiceless Voice in Hiroshima for soloists, narrators, chorus, tape (ad lib.) and orchestra (1989/2001) after Matsuo Bashō, Paul Celan and the film Genbaku no Ko

Orchestral
 Preludio (1982)
 In die Tiefe der Zeit (Into the Depths of Time)
 Ferne Landschaft I (a work commissioned by Kyoto city. 1987, Ken-Ichiro Kobayashi & Kyoto Symphony Orchestra.)
 Ferne Landschaft II (a work commissioned by the Gunma Symphony Orchestra. 1996, Ken Takaseki & Gunma Symphony Orchestra.)
 Ferne Landschaft III – seascapes of Fukuyama (a work commissioned by Fukuyama city. 1996, Naohiro Totsuka & Hiroshima Symphony Orchestra.)
 Circulating Ocean (2005)
 danses imaginaires (2007)
 Woven Dreams (2009–10)
 Meditation (2011–12) for the victims of the tsunami (3.11)

Concertante
 Flute concerto Per Sonare (1988)
 Cello concerto (1997)
 Voyage I for violin and ensemble (1997)
 Voyage II for bassoon and ensemble (1997)
 Lotus under the Moonlight (Hommage à Mozart) for piano and orchestra (2006)
 Chant for cello and orchestra (2009)
 Horn concerto Moment of Blossoming (2010)
 Sublimation for cello and orchestra (2016)
 Ceremony for flute and orchestra (2021–2022)

Chamber music
 Landscape V for shō and string quartet (1993)
 Silent Flowers for string quartet (1998)
 Deep Silence (2002), duets for shō (bamboo mouth organ) and accordion in the Gagaku style, including:
 Cloudscapes – Moon Night
 Wie ein Atmen im Lichte after a drawing of Rudolf Steiner
 Sen V
 Blossoming for string quartet (2007)
 Kalligraphie for string quartet (2007)
 Lied II (リート II) for viola and piano (2008)
 Für Walter for soprano saxophone and piano, percussion ad libitum (2010), dedicated to Walter Fink for his 80th birthday
 Spell (呪文) for violin solo (2010)
 Lullaby of Itsuki: from Japanese Folk Songs (五木の子守歌 −日本民謡より−) for violin and piano (2011)
 Threnody: To the victims of the Tōhoku 3.11 earthquake (哀歌 −東日本大震災の犠牲者に捧げる−) for viola solo (2011)
 Water of Lethe for Piano Quartet, composed 2016 for the Fauré Quartet, supported by the Ernst von Siemens Musikstiftung
 Im Nebel for Trumpet and Piano (2016)
Weaving Song for String Quartet (2020)

Vocal music
 "Renka I" for soprano and guitar (1986)
 "Three love songs" for voice and alto saxophone (2005)
 "Klage" for soprano and orchestra (2013)
 "Drei Engel-Lieder" for soprano and harp (2014)

Choral music
 "Ave Maria for 16-part mixed choir a cappella" (1991)

Solo works
 Slow Motion for accordion (2002)
 Voice for trombone (2020)

Literature 
 Walter-Wolfgang Sparrer: Toshio Hosokawa. in Komponisten der Gegenwart. Ed. Text + Kritik, Munich. pp. 1992ff.   
 Toshio Hosokawa, Walter-Wolfgang Sparrer: Stille und Klang, Schatten und Licht. Gespräche. Wolke-Verlag, Hofheim 2012. 
 Luciana Galliano (ed.): Lotus. La Musica di Toshio Hosokawa. Auditorium Edizioni, Milano 2013.
 Reinhart Meyer-Kalkus: Auskomponierte Stimmen. Toshio Hosokawas Vokalkompositionen. In: Neue Zeitschrift für Musik, 169.2008, Issue 1, pp. 62–65.
 Basil Rogger (ed.): Roche Commissions Toshio Hosokawa, im Auftrag von Roche und der Carnegie Hall New York, dem Cleveland Orchestra sowie dem Lucerne Festival, Luzern 2010. Program book in English and German.
 Sparrer: Toshio Hosokawas Musik in ihrem Verhältnis zu japanischen Tradition. in: Jörn Peter Hiekel (ed.): Ins Offene? Neue Musik und Natur. Darmstädter Beiträge zur Neuen Musik. Schott, Mainz 2014, pp. 132–157.

References

Further reading
Narazaki, Yoko. 2001. "Hosokawa, Toshio". The New Grove Dictionary of Music and Musicians, 2nd edition, edited by Stanley Sadie and John Tyrrell. London: Macmillan.

External links
 
 Toshio Hosokawa on Naxos site
 Toshio Hosokawa on Neos site, a label for Contemporary Music
 Toshio Hosokawa on agent's site
 
 Interview by Fabrizio Rota
 Toshio Hosokawa on Goethe-Institut Korea site

1955 births
20th-century classical composers
20th-century Japanese composers
20th-century Japanese male musicians
21st-century classical composers
21st-century Japanese composers
21st-century Japanese male musicians
Berlin University of the Arts alumni
Contemporary classical music performers
Hochschule für Musik Freiburg alumni
Japanese classical composers
Japanese contemporary classical composers
Japanese male classical composers
Japanese opera composers
Living people
Male opera composers
Members of the Academy of Arts, Berlin
Musicians from Hiroshima
Recipients of the Medal with Purple Ribbon